Billie Mary "Betty" Chua Go-Belmonte (December 31, 1933 – January 28, 1994) was a Filipina journalist and newspaper publisher. She established the STAR Group of Publications which publishes the national newspaper, The Philippine Star and The Freeman, the tabloids Pilipino Star Ngayon, Pang-Masa, and Banat, as well as the magazines Starweek, People Asia, and The Fookien Times Yearbook.

A  street as well as a Manila LRT Line 2 station  was named after her.

Early life
Belmonte was the eldest child of Jaime Go Puan Seng (1906–1987), founder of the Filipino-Chinese newspaper The Fookien Times and Felisa Velasco Chua (1911–2002), the daughter of a merchant family, both of Chinese descent. She had four younger sisters namely Cecile (1936–2004), Dorcy (1938–1999), Elsie (1941–2009) and Gracie (1946–) as well as an only younger brother, Andrew (1951–). She grew up with a devout Protestant upbringing in the Santa Mesa district of Manila as well as in the Kamias district of Quezon City. When she was eight years old, her family moved to the foothills of the Sierra Madre mountains, near Ipo Dam to escape persecution from advancing Japanese forces during World War II, where they lived in poverty.

Education
After the war, Billie Mary Go and her siblings took their elementary studies at Kamuning Public School and Hope Christian High School, and their high school studies at the Philippine Christian Colleges and UP High School. She was often teased at school for having a boy's name, so her father started calling her Betty. When she was 19, she wanted to become a Protestant missionary and stay single. This upset her grandmother, who wanted her to marry. In college, she wanted to be a painter and pursue a course in Fine Arts but her father thought she would not be able to make a living as a painter and enrolled her in an English degree at the University of the Philippines Diliman instead.

In UP, Betty Go experienced prejudice for being a Filipino of Chinese ancestry. Despite being born in the Philippines and having a local-born mother, because of her father's dual citizenship and emigrant status, she was treated a dual citizen unfairly as well by (native) Filipino students. Henceforth, she decided to join student organizations and activities, as well as, ran and won in the student elections to prove that a person of Filipino of Chinese ancestry can run and hold office.

After finishing college, Go attended Claremont Graduate School for her master's degree in English and American literature.

Career
Betty Go's father, Jaime Go Puan Seng, founded The Fookien Times in 1927, which was once the biggest Filipino-Chinese newspaper in the Philippines. During the 1930s, the newspaper was known for exposing government anomalies and corruption, which led to libel lawsuits being filed against his father. He was acquitted and his case became the basis for the establishment of Philippine libel laws.

Her father saw her as his heir in managing the newspaper. After finishing her master's degree abroad, she was employed at the company as an assistant to the editor. She proofread articles and proved herself to be a very capable newspaper manager and publisher, with a deep sense of commitment and ethics.

Martial law
During the administration of Ferdinand Marcos, The Fookien Times was one of newspapers critical of the government. After Marcos' declaration of Martial Law in 1972, the newspaper was one of several newspapers forced to close by the government. Go Puan Seng went on a self-imposed exile in Canada after the newspaper ceased publication. Belmonte, who was by then already married to Feliciano Belmonte, Jr., remained in the Philippines despite threats from Imelda Marcos that she will kick them out of the country. She continued writing through her weekly Dear Billie advice column in the Daily Express newspaper.

In the early '80s, when Marcos eased restrictions on publications, Belmonte started a small monthly magazine called The Star, a predecessor of The Philippine STAR. It was one of several opposition magazines and tabloids, like Mr & Ms Special Edition, Panorama, We Forum, and Tempo, that were critical of the Marcos administration, dubbed the mosquito press.

On 9 December 1985, following the demand for a credible and independent broadsheet, Belmonte, together with Mr & Ms publisher, Eugenia Apostol, and columnist Maximo Soliven, founded the Philippine Daily Inquirer which would become the leading Philippine broadsheet at that time.

The Philippine STAR

After the EDSA Revolution that toppled Ferdinand Marcos and restored democracy in the Philippines, questions finances and divergence of priorities caused a rift among Inquirer's publishers that led Belmonte and Soliven to leave the newspaper and to establish their own broadsheet. Belmonte was perceived as affecting the newspaper's credibility and was asked to leave. She left the newspaper even as its publishers owed her money which was used to put up Inquirer.

On March 17, 1986, Belmonte established her own Filipino tabloid newspaper, Ang Pilipino Ngayon. It would grow in circulation to become the leading Filipino tabloid in the Philippines. A few months later, on July 28, 1986, Belmonte, Soliven, and Art Borjal established the national broadsheet The Philippine STAR that would compete against Inquirer and Manila Bulletin. Under Belmonte's chairmanship, STAR would later on surpass the two broadsheets to become the most widely circulated newspaper in the Philippines, distinguished for its balanced, objective, and fair reporting.

Philanthropy
As chairman of STAR, Belmonte was active in various corporate social responsibility activities. In the STAR's maiden issue, the day's biggest news was the death of 23-year-old Stephen Salcedo at the hands of Marcos loyalists, just because he was wearing yellow. The headline screamed, "Wear yellow and die," and was accompanied by photos of the mob beating Salcedo to death. For several days, the paper closely followed the story and, through photos, those responsible were eventually caught.

The story touched Belmonte so much that she extended financial (from donations solicited through her column "Pebbles") and emotional support to Salcedo's widow and children. This laid the foundation of Operation Damayan, the STAR's corporate social responsibility arm, which was formed in 1989 and would help thousands of communities in the Philippines during natural disasters and calamities.

Belmonte was also involved in other civic associations. She was president of the Quezon City Associated Ladies Foundation, Inc., governor of the Philippine National Red Cross, director of the UP Alumni Association, and trustee of the UP Foundation and the Sigma Delta Phi Foundation, Inc. In 1993, Belmonte was awarded the Gintong Ina award for her contributions to media and journalism.

Personal life and death
Belmonte was married to Feliciano Belmonte, Jr. until her death. The couple had four children, namely Isaac, Kevin, Miguel, and Joy. Their three sons hold editorial and managerial positions at The Philippine STAR, and its sister at publications like Pilipino Star Ngayon, Pang Masa, and The Freeman. Her daughter Joy serves as the incumbent mayor of Quezon City.

Belmonte was a devout Protestant, instructing the staff of The Philippine Star to forfeit the Sunday issue in its first two years of existence as they should not work on the Sabbath day.

She died in Quezon City on January 28, 1994, due to cancer at the age of 60, 27 days after her 60th birthday.

See also

References

1933 births
1994 deaths
Burials at the Loyola Memorial Park
Claremont Graduate University alumni
Filipino journalists
Filipino newspaper publishers (people)
Filipino people of Chinese descent
Filipino politicians of Chinese descent
Filipino Protestants
Filipino women journalists
Filipino women writers
Filipino writers
People from Santa Mesa
People from Quezon City
The Philippine Star people
University of the Philippines Diliman alumni
Writers from Metro Manila
20th-century journalists